Ringway can mean:
Ringway, Greater Manchester, a civil parish within the city of Manchester, England
Manchester Airport, initially known as Ringway Airport, located near Ringway.
RAF Ringway, the name for Manchester Airport during the second world war
London Ringways, a series of proposed ring roads

See also
Route 1 (Iceland), a road all round the edge of Iceland